David Ephraim Hayden (October 2, 1897 – March 18, 1974) was a United States Navy Hospital Corpsman who served during World War I and earned the Medal of Honor for valiant actions in France.

Biography
Hayden was born in Florence, Texas, and enlisted in the Navy in October 1917. He received training in San Diego Naval Base, California, and Quantico, Virginia. During the war, he was attached to the 2/6th Marines as a Hospital Apprentice First Class. The Marine outfit saw action in France at the Battle of Saint-Mihiel, during which Hayden ran through heavy enemy fire to administer aid to a wounded Marine, Corporal Creed. For this action, he was awarded the Medal of Honor.

After the war, Hayden was promoted to Pharmacist's Mate Third Class. He served aboard the troop transport Princess Matoika until the summer of 1920. He then served as a U.S. Marshal in California until the age of seventy. David E Hayden died on March 18, 1974, and He was buried at Arlington National Cemetery, Arlington, Virginia.

Medal of Honor citation
Rank and organization: Hospital Apprentice First Class, U.S. Navy, serving with the 2d Battalion, 6th Regiment, U.S. Marines. Place and date: Thiaucourt, France, 15 September 1918. Entered service at: Texas. Born: 2 October 1897 Florence, Tex.

Citation:

For gallantry and intrepidity at the risk of his life above and beyond the call of duty. During the advance, when Cpl. Creed was mortally wounded while crossing an open field swept by machinegun fire, Hayden unhesitatingly ran to his assistance and, finding him so severely wounded as to require immediate attention, disregarded his own personal safety to dress the wound under intense machinegun fire, and then carried the wounded man back to a place of safety.

See also

 List of Medal of Honor recipients for World War I

References

External links
 
 David E. Hayden at ArlingtonCemetery.net, an unofficial website
 Who's Who in Marine Corps History

1897 births
1974 deaths
United States Navy personnel of World War I
Burials at Arlington National Cemetery
United States Navy Medal of Honor recipients
United States Navy corpsmen
Military personnel from Texas
People from Williamson County, Texas
United States Marshals
World War I recipients of the Medal of Honor